Hamersley may refer to:

People 
Hamersley (surname)
The Hamersley family, Australian family

Toponyms 
Hamersley, Western Australia is a suburb of Perth, Western Australia
Hamersley Range, a mountain range in northwestern Western Australia
Hamersley River, an ephemeral river in the Great Southern region of Western Australia
Hamersley National Park, the former name of Karijini National Park in northwestern Western Australia
Hamersley Station, a pastoral lease in the Pilbara region of Western Australia

See also 
Hammersley